Paul Czege is a designer of tabletop role-playing games. His My Life With Master was the third role-playing game to win the Diana Jones award. He is also the originator of the Czege Principle that states, "When one person is the author of both the character's adversity and its resolution, play isn't fun."

Biography

Game design
Czege was a member of The Forge and later became a publisher of indie role-playing games. He is one of the more influential game designers who started developing games at The Forge and is considered simultaneously one of the most prolific and one of the least prolific designers from that movement as he released nine games over a period of six years, but only fully published My Life With Master, releasing the rest for free.

Games
 The World, the Flesh, and the Devil
 Nicotine Girls
 My Life with Master
 The Valedictorian’s Death
 Bacchanal
 Specimen for the Resurrection
 Acts of Evil (released incomplete)
 The Niche Engine
 Honeydew
 Thy Vernal Chieftains
 The Clay that Woke

References

American game designers
Living people
Place of birth missing (living people)
Role-playing game designers
Indie role-playing game designers
Year of birth missing (living people)